Dražen Međedović (Cyrillic: Дpaжeн Meђeдoвић, born 15 October 1982) is a Montenegrin football manager and former player who played as a attacking midfielder. He is manager of Čelik Nikšić.

Club career

Sutjeska Nikšić
Međedović made his professional debut with Sutjeska Nikšić in the 1999-2000 season, after which he played seven consecutive seasons for Sutjeska. He scored in the 2007 Montenegrin Cup final against Rudar Pljevlja, although Sutjeska ended up losing. He was loaned to Budućnost in 2006, after which he was transferred to Mogren.

Return to Sutjeska
Upon returning to his hometown club, Međedović featured in Sutjeska's 2009-10 UEFA Europa League qualifying campaign. In the first qualifying round, Sutjeska was drawn with MTZ-RIPO, and Međedović scored a goal in the first leg played in Nikšić.

Borac Banja Luka
Međedović joined Borac Banja Luka in 2011. He played in a friendly match with Red Star Belgrade on 20 February 2011, which Borac lost by a score of 2–1.

Čelik Nikšić
After spending a brief half-season with Borac Banja Luka, Međedović signed a short 6-month contract with ambitious Montenegrin side FK Čelik Nikšić. After appearing in thirteen matches, he did not extend his contract despite impressing the management of the club and considered to retire from football.

Career statistics

Club

Personal life
His father Miodrag Međedović also played for Sutjeska.

References

External sources

1982 births
Living people
Footballers from Nikšić
Association football midfielders
Serbia and Montenegro footballers
Montenegrin footballers
FK Sutjeska Nikšić players
FK Budućnost Podgorica players
FK Mogren players
FK Bokelj players
FK Borac Banja Luka players
FK Čelik Nikšić players
OFK Grbalj players
First League of Serbia and Montenegro players
Montenegrin First League players
Premier League of Bosnia and Herzegovina players
Montenegrin expatriate footballers
Expatriate footballers in Bosnia and Herzegovina
Montenegrin expatriate sportspeople in Bosnia and Herzegovina